The 1980 VFL season was the 84th season of the Victorian Football League (VFL), the highest level senior Australian rules football competition in Victoria. The season featured twelve clubs, ran from 29 March until 27 September, and comprised a 22-game home-and-away season followed by a finals series featuring the top five clubs.

The premiership was won by the Richmond Football Club for the tenth time, after it defeated  by 81 points in the 1980 VFL Grand Final.

Night series
 defeated  8.9 (57) to 7.12 (54) in the final.

Premiership season

Round 1

|- bgcolor="#CCCCFF"
| Home team
| Home team score
| Away team
| Away team score
| Venue
| Crowd
| Date
|- bgcolor="#FFFFFF"
| 
| 15.16 (106)
| 
| 16.15 (111)
| Princes Park
| 21,028
| 29 March 1980
|- bgcolor="#FFFFFF"
| 
| 12.13 (85)
| 
| 13.10 (88)
| Kardinia Park
| 22,685
| 29 March 1980
|- bgcolor="#FFFFFF"
| 
| 12.15 (87)
| 
| 15.10 (100)
| Windy Hill
| 28,811
| 29 March 1980
|- bgcolor="#FFFFFF"
| 
| 17.11 (113)
| 
| 18.17 (125)
| Western Oval
| 20,060
| 29 March 1980
|- bgcolor="#FFFFFF"
| 
| 13.16 (94)
| 
| 19.18 (132)
| Victoria Park
| 29,587
| 29 March 1980
|- bgcolor="#FFFFFF"
| 
| 14.16 (100)
| 
| 18.14 (122)
| VFL Park
| 31,859
| 29 March 1980

Round 2

|- bgcolor="#CCCCFF"
| Home team
| Home team score
| Away team
| Away team score
| Venue
| Crowd
| Date
|- bgcolor="#FFFFFF"
| 
| 17.15 (117)
| 
| 17.22 (124)
| MCG
| 51,548
| 5 April 1980
|- bgcolor="#FFFFFF"
| 
| 7.14 (56)
| 
| 7.19 (61)
| Arden Street Oval
| 24,363
| 5 April 1980

|- bgcolor="#FFFFFF"
| 
| 11.17 (83)
| 
| 15.26 (116)
| Moorabbin Oval
| 22,265
| 5 April 1980
|- bgcolor="#FFFFFF"
| 
| 17.14 (116)
| 
| 22.8 (140)
| VFL Park
| 28,802
| 7 April 1980
|- bgcolor="#FFFFFF"
| 
| 14.25 (109)
| 
| 15.14 (104)
| Princes Park
| 32,614
| 7 April 1980
|- bgcolor="#FFFFFF"
| 
| 14.17 (101)
| 
| 10.13 (73)
| Lake Oval
| 19,191
| 7 April 1980

Round 3

|- bgcolor="#CCCCFF"
| Home team
| Home team score
| Away team
| Away team score
| Venue
| Crowd
| Date
|- bgcolor="#FFFFFF"
| 
| 18.20 (128)
| 
| 19.14 (128)
| MCG
| 37,076
| 12 April 1980
|- bgcolor="#FFFFFF"
| 
| 17.17 (119)
| 
| 14.9 (93)
| Kardinia Park
| 21,504
| 12 April 1980
|- bgcolor="#FFFFFF"
| 
| 14.18 (102)
| 
| 21.22 (148)
| Junction Oval
| 14,548
| 12 April 1980
|- bgcolor="#FFFFFF"
| 
| 19.16 (130)
| 
| 16.23 (119)
| Princes Park
| 27,034
| 12 April 1980
|- bgcolor="#FFFFFF"
| 
| 14.10 (94)
| 
| 17.17 (119)
| Western Oval
| 21,434
| 12 April 1980
|- bgcolor="#FFFFFF"
| 
| 14.17 (101)
| 
| 24.12 (156)
| VFL Park
| 33,909
| 12 April 1980

Round 4

|- bgcolor="#CCCCFF"
| Home team
| Home team score
| Away team
| Away team score
| Venue
| Crowd
| Date
|- bgcolor="#FFFFFF"
| 
| 8.9 (57)
| 
| 16.13 (109)
| Victoria Park
| 29,888
| 19 April 1980
|- bgcolor="#FFFFFF"
| 
| 22.18 (150)
| 
| 13.15 (93)
| Princes Park
| 20,794
| 19 April 1980
|- bgcolor="#FFFFFF"
| 
| 10.9 (69)
| 
| 16.10 (106)
| Arden Street Oval
| 15,437
| 19 April 1980
|- bgcolor="#FFFFFF"
| 
| 18.21 (129)
| 
| 18.12 (120)
| MCG
| 20,905
| 19 April 1980
|- bgcolor="#FFFFFF"
| 
| 11.17 (83)
| 
| 12.8 (80)
| Moorabbin Oval
| 30,947
| 19 April 1980
|- bgcolor="#FFFFFF"
| 
| 12.10 (82)
| 
| 11.19 (85)
| VFL Park
| 26,104
| 19 April 1980

Round 5

|- bgcolor="#CCCCFF"
| Home team
| Home team score
| Away team
| Away team score
| Venue
| Crowd
| Date
|- bgcolor="#FFFFFF"
| 
| 14.10 (94)
| 
| 13.11 (89)
| Kardinia Park
| 34,256
| 25 April 1980
|- bgcolor="#FFFFFF"
| 
| 29.25 (199)
| 
| 11.15 (81)
| MCG
| 44,401
| 25 April 1980
|- bgcolor="#FFFFFF"
| 
| 14.19 (103)
| 
| 9.20 (74)
| VFL Park
| 60,784
| 25 April 1980
|- bgcolor="#FFFFFF"
| 
| 17.20 (122)
| 
| 7.15 (57)
| Lake Oval
| 23,003
| 26 April 1980
|- bgcolor="#FFFFFF"
| 
| 9.15 (69)
| 
| 10.13 (73)
| Windy Hill
| 32,140
| 26 April 1980
|- bgcolor="#FFFFFF"
| 
| 8.7 (55)
| 
| 26.21 (177)
| SCG
| 13,476
| 27 April 1980

Round 6

|- bgcolor="#CCCCFF"
| Home team
| Home team score
| Away team
| Away team score
| Venue
| Crowd
| Date
|- bgcolor="#FFFFFF"
| 
| 15.14 (104)
| 
| 19.16 (130)
| MCG
| 22,487
| 3 May 1980
|- bgcolor="#FFFFFF"
| 
| 26.12 (168)
| 
| 16.12 (108)
| Victoria Park
| 29,094
| 3 May 1980
|- bgcolor="#FFFFFF"
| 
| 19.16 (130)
| 
| 18.5 (113)
| Princes Park
| 11,958
| 3 May 1980
|- bgcolor="#FFFFFF"
| 
| 16.12 (108)
| 
| 15.23 (113)
| Junction Oval
| 17,562
| 3 May 1980
|- bgcolor="#FFFFFF"
| 
| 18.11 (119)
| 
| 12.15 (87)
| Arden Street Oval
| 24,644
| 3 May 1980
|- bgcolor="#FFFFFF"
| 
| 10.17 (77)
| 
| 12.16 (88)
| VFL Park
| 47,265
| 3 May 1980

Round 7

|- bgcolor="#CCCCFF"
| Home team
| Home team score
| Away team
| Away team score
| Venue
| Crowd
| Date
|- bgcolor="#FFFFFF"
| 
| 10.10 (70)
| 
| 27.18 (180)
| Western Oval
| 16,471
| 10 May 1980
|- bgcolor="#FFFFFF"
| 
| 13.15 (93)
| 
| 16.11 (107)
| Windy Hill
| 23,993
| 10 May 1980
|- bgcolor="#FFFFFF"
| 
| 14.27 (111)
| 
| 16.17 (113)
| Princes Park
| 26,414
| 10 May 1980
|- bgcolor="#FFFFFF"
| 
| 12.20 (92)
| 
| 18.23 (131)
| Moorabbin Oval
| 17,557
| 10 May 1980
|- bgcolor="#FFFFFF"
| 
| 17.13 (115)
| 
| 13.12 (90)
| Lake Oval
| 22,375
| 10 May 1980
|- bgcolor="#FFFFFF"
| 
| 10.12 (72)
| 
| 24.15 (159)
| VFL Park
| 18,939
| 10 May 1980

Round 8

|- bgcolor="#CCCCFF"
| Home team
| Home team score
| Away team
| Away team score
| Venue
| Crowd
| Date
|- bgcolor="#FFFFFF"
| 
| 15.19 (109)
| 
| 16.10 (106)
| Arden Street Oval
| 17,190
| 17 May 1980
|- bgcolor="#FFFFFF"
| 
| 17.16 (118)
| 
| 15.18 (108)
| Princes Park
| 10,504
| 17 May 1980
|- bgcolor="#FFFFFF"
| 
| 20.15 (135)
| 
| 10.12 (72)
| Kardinia Park
| 22,449
| 17 May 1980
|- bgcolor="#FFFFFF"
| 
| 17.16 (118)
| 
| 17.16 (118)
| Junction Oval
| 20,596
| 17 May 1980
|- bgcolor="#FFFFFF"
| 
| 19.24 (138)
| 
| 12.13 (85)
| MCG
| 85,659
| 17 May 1980
|- bgcolor="#FFFFFF"
| 
| 10.11 (71)
| 
| 22.16 (148)
| VFL Park
| 21,851
| 17 May 1980

Round 9

|- bgcolor="#CCCCFF"
| Home team
| Home team score
| Away team
| Away team score
| Venue
| Crowd
| Date
|- bgcolor="#FFFFFF"
| 
| 15.12 (102)
| 
| 29.21 (195)
| MCG
| 27,217
| 24 May 1980
|- bgcolor="#FFFFFF"
| 
| 14.16 (100)
| 
| 16.25 (121)
| Junction Oval
| 14,665
| 24 May 1980
|- bgcolor="#FFFFFF"
| 
| 18.28 (136)
| 
| 15.15 (105)
| Victoria Park
| 30,157
| 24 May 1980
|- bgcolor="#FFFFFF"
| 
| 19.15 (129)
| 
| 15.13 (103)
| Moorabbin Oval
| 15,207
| 24 May 1980
|- bgcolor="#FFFFFF"
| 
| 14.9 (93)
| 
| 13.10 (88)
| VFL Park
| 34,384
| 24 May 1980
|- bgcolor="#FFFFFF"
| 
| 13.16 (94)
| 
| 20.11 (131)
| SCG
| 24,545
| 25 May 1980

Round 10

|- bgcolor="#CCCCFF"
| Home team
| Home team score
| Away team
| Away team score
| Venue
| Crowd
| Date
|- bgcolor="#FFFFFF"
| 
| 17.18 (120)
| 
| 11.10 (76)
| Windy Hill
| 16,504
| 31 May 1980
|- bgcolor="#FFFFFF"
| 
| 15.15 (105)
| 
| 13.20 (98)
| MCG
| 61,769
| 31 May 1980
|- bgcolor="#FFFFFF"
| 
| 28.15 (183)
| 
| 14.15 (99)
| Lake Oval
| 17,420
| 31 May 1980
|- bgcolor="#FFFFFF"
| 
| 18.15 (123)
| 
| 17.6 (108)
| Kardinia Park
| 19,581
| 31 May 1980
|- bgcolor="#FFFFFF"
| 
| 18.11 (119)
| 
| 24.17 (161)
| Western Oval
| 21,482
| 31 May 1980
|- bgcolor="#FFFFFF"
| 
| 14.20 (104)
| 
| 9.8 (62)
| VFL Park
| 37,594
| 31 May 1980

Round 11

|- bgcolor="#CCCCFF"
| Home team
| Home team score
| Away team
| Away team score
| Venue
| Crowd
| Date
|- bgcolor="#FFFFFF"
| 
| 15.13 (103)
| 
| 22.12 (144)
| Western Oval
| 15,519
| 7 June 1980
|- bgcolor="#FFFFFF"
| 
| 19.15 (129)
| 
| 18.11 (119)
| Victoria Park
| 23,040
| 7 June 1980
|- bgcolor="#FFFFFF"
| 
| 12.8 (80)
| 
| 25.13 (163)
| Moorabbin Oval
| 16,506
| 7 June 1980
|- bgcolor="#FFFFFF"
| 
| 9.17 (71)
| 
| 13.11 (89)
| Princes Park
| 21,223
| 7 June 1980
|- bgcolor="#FFFFFF"
| 
| 19.12 (126)
| 
| 22.24 (156)
| Junction Oval
| 15,286
| 7 June 1980
|- bgcolor="#FFFFFF"
| 
| 18.13 (121)
| 
| 10.8 (68)
| VFL Park
| 50,017
| 7 June 1980

Round 12

|- bgcolor="#CCCCFF"
| Home team
| Home team score
| Away team
| Away team score
| Venue
| Crowd
| Date
|- bgcolor="#FFFFFF"
| 
| 19.20 (134)
| 
| 14.8 (92)
| MCG
| 26,324
| 14 June 1980
|- bgcolor="#FFFFFF"
| 
| 18.15 (123)
| 
| 25.17 (167)
| Junction Oval
| 10,681
| 14 June 1980
|- bgcolor="#FFFFFF"
| 
| 15.11 (101)
| 
| 10.12 (72)
| Arden Street Oval
| 28,068
| 14 June 1980
|- bgcolor="#FFFFFF"
| 
| 12.12 (84)
| 
| 21.21 (147)
| SCG
| 13,209
| 15 June 1980
|- bgcolor="#FFFFFF"
| 
| 13.12 (90)
| 
| 11.19 (85)
| Princes Park
| 43,599
| 16 June 1980
|- bgcolor="#FFFFFF"
| 
| 16.12 (108)
| 
| 11.22 (88)
| MCG
| 57,572
| 16 June 1980

Round 13

|- bgcolor="#CCCCFF"
| Home team
| Home team score
| Away team
| Away team score
| Venue
| Crowd
| Date
|- bgcolor="#FFFFFF"
| 
| 21.17 (143)
| 
| 16.13 (109)
| Princes Park
| 11,686
| 21 June 1980
|- bgcolor="#FFFFFF"
| 
| 15.14 (104)
| 
| 12.15 (87)
| Western Oval
| 15,837
| 21 June 1980
|- bgcolor="#FFFFFF"
| 
| 15.17 (107)
| 
| 16.21 (117)
| Windy Hill
| 24,045
| 21 June 1980
|- bgcolor="#FFFFFF"
| 
| 18.21 (129)
| 
| 18.9 (117)
| MCG
| 15,075
| 21 June 1980
|- bgcolor="#FFFFFF"
| 
| 12.11 (83)
| 
| 12.6 (78)
| Kardinia Park
| 26,526
| 21 June 1980
|- bgcolor="#FFFFFF"
| 
| 20.19 (139)
| 
| 13.15 (93)
| VFL Park
| 54,675
| 21 June 1980

Round 14

|- bgcolor="#CCCCFF"
| Home team
| Home team score
| Away team
| Away team score
| Venue
| Crowd
| Date
|- bgcolor="#FFFFFF"
| 
| 13.6 (84)
| 
| 4.3 (27)
| Kardinia Park
| 21,555
| 28 June 1980
|- bgcolor="#FFFFFF"
| 
| 10.13 (73)
| 
| 6.7 (43)
| Western Oval
| 11,785
| 28 June 1980
|- bgcolor="#FFFFFF"
| 
| 21.17 (143)
| 
| 8.7 (55)
| Princes Park
| 8,209
| 28 June 1980
|- bgcolor="#FFFFFF"
| 
| 9.19 (73)
| 
| 7.22 (64)
| MCG
| 64,054
| 28 June 1980
|- bgcolor="#FFFFFF"
| 
| 5.9 (39)
| 
| 10.18 (78)
| Lake Oval
| 12,362
| 28 June 1980
|- bgcolor="#FFFFFF"
| 
| 6.12 (48)
| 
| 7.11 (53)
| VFL Park
| 20,485
| 28 June 1980

Round 15

|- bgcolor="#CCCCFF"
| Home team
| Home team score
| Away team
| Away team score
| Venue
| Crowd
| Date
|- bgcolor="#FFFFFF"
| 
| 5.6 (36)
| 
| 6.14 (50)
| Moorabbin Oval
| 16,840
| 12 July 1980
|- bgcolor="#FFFFFF"
| 
| 15.19 (109)
| 
| 12.16 (88)
| Junction Oval
| 11,362
| 12 July 1980
|- bgcolor="#FFFFFF"
| 
| 11.22 (88)
| 
| 13.6 (84)
| Victoria Park
| 30,659
| 12 July 1980
|- bgcolor="#FFFFFF"
| 
| 15.19 (109)
| 
| 7.8 (50)
| Arden Street Oval
| 15,277
| 12 July 1980
|- bgcolor="#FFFFFF"
| 
| 15.13 (103)
| 
| 18.24 (132)
| MCG
| 26,216
| 12 July 1980
|- bgcolor="#FFFFFF"
| 
| 4.13 (37)
| 
| 17.15 (117)
| VFL Park
| 34,204
| 12 July 1980

Round 16

|- bgcolor="#CCCCFF"
| Home team
| Home team score
| Away team
| Away team score
| Venue
| Crowd
| Date
|- bgcolor="#FFFFFF"
| 
| 20.9 (129)
| 
| 19.19 (133)
| Windy Hill
| 17,471
| 19 July 1980
|- bgcolor="#FFFFFF"
| 
| 22.17 (149)
| 
| 19.8 (122)
| Victoria Park
| 25,090
| 19 July 1980
|- bgcolor="#FFFFFF"
| 
| 24.16 (160)
| 
| 15.13 (103)
| Princes Park
| 18,792
| 19 July 1980
|- bgcolor="#FFFFFF"
| 
| 15.15 (105)
| 
| 17.12 (114)
| MCG
| 23,327
| 19 July 1980
|- bgcolor="#FFFFFF"
| 
| 17.13 (115)
| 
| 13.8 (86)
| VFL Park
| 16,002
| 19 July 1980
|- bgcolor="#FFFFFF"
| 
| 11.4 (70)
| 
| 34.18 (222)
| SCG
| 14,077
| 20 July 1980

Round 17

|- bgcolor="#CCCCFF"
| Home team
| Home team score
| Away team
| Away team score
| Venue
| Crowd
| Date
|- bgcolor="#FFFFFF"
| 
| 25.10 (160)
| 
| 15.17 (107)
| Western Oval
| 12,362
| 26 July 1980
|- bgcolor="#FFFFFF"
| 
| 18.14 (122)
| 
| 17.14 (116)
| Windy Hill
| 14,372
| 26 July 1980
|- bgcolor="#FFFFFF"
| 
| 14.17 (101)
| 
| 20.13 (133)
| Princes Park
| 26,347
| 26 July 1980
|- bgcolor="#FFFFFF"
| 
| 17.22 (124)
| 
| 13.12 (90)
| Lake Oval
| 11,643
| 26 July 1980
|- bgcolor="#FFFFFF"
| 
| 13.15 (93)
| 
| 16.14 (110)
| MCG
| 70,068
| 26 July 1980
|- bgcolor="#FFFFFF"
| 
| 16.11 (107)
| 
| 32.19 (211)
| VFL Park
| 33,933
| 26 July 1980

Round 18

|- bgcolor="#CCCCFF"
| Home team
| Home team score
| Away team
| Away team score
| Venue
| Crowd
| Date
|- bgcolor="#FFFFFF"
| 
| 15.14 (104)
| 
| 12.8 (80)
| Junction Oval
| 6,836
| 2 August 1980
|- bgcolor="#FFFFFF"
| 
| 11.24 (90)
| 
| 8.9 (57)
| Victoria Park
| 24,739
| 2 August 1980
|- bgcolor="#FFFFFF"
| 
| 12.15 (87)
| 
| 7.15 (57)
| Arden Street Oval
| 7,544
| 2 August 1980
|- bgcolor="#FFFFFF"
| 
| 15.14 (104)
| 
| 13.12 (90)
| Kardinia Park
| 24,738
| 2 August 1980
|- bgcolor="#FFFFFF"
| 
| 9.15 (69)
| 
| 16.17 (113)
| Princes Park
| 15,046
| 2 August 1980
|- bgcolor="#FFFFFF"
| 
| 23.18 (156)
| 
| 6.5 (41)
| VFL Park
| 18,282
| 2 August 1980

Round 19

|- bgcolor="#CCCCFF"
| Home team
| Home team score
| Away team
| Away team score
| Venue
| Crowd
| Date
|- bgcolor="#FFFFFF"
| 
| 18.8 (116)
| 
| 11.8 (74)
| Windy Hill
| 16,952
| 9 August 1980
|- bgcolor="#FFFFFF"
| 
| 12.19 (91)
| 
| 10.10 (70)
| Princes Park
| 30,051
| 9 August 1980
|- bgcolor="#FFFFFF"
| 
| 12.13 (85)
| 
| 11.7 (73)
| Lake Oval
| 13,681
| 9 August 1980
|- bgcolor="#FFFFFF"
| 
| 9.10 (64)
| 
| 19.27 (141)
| MCG
| 15,447
| 9 August 1980
|- bgcolor="#FFFFFF"
| 
| 13.10 (88)
| 
| 11.17 (83)
| Moorabbin Oval
| 13,236
| 9 August 1980
|- bgcolor="#FFFFFF"
| 
| 19.10 (124)
| 
| 16.19 (115)
| VFL Park
| 31,013
| 9 August 1980

Round 20

|- bgcolor="#CCCCFF"
| Home team
| Home team score
| Away team
| Away team score
| Venue
| Crowd
| Date
|- bgcolor="#FFFFFF"
| 
| 16.22 (118)
| 
| 11.7 (73)
| Western Oval
| 13,966
| 16 August 1980
|- bgcolor="#FFFFFF"
| 
| 25.14 (164)
| 
| 16.7 (103)
| Princes Park
| 27,955
| 16 August 1980
|- bgcolor="#FFFFFF"
| 
| 26.18 (174)
| 
| 16.13 (109)
| MCG
| 19,048
| 16 August 1980
|- bgcolor="#FFFFFF"
| 
| 20.14 (134)
| 
| 17.15 (117)
| Lake Oval
| 12,015
| 16 August 1980
|- bgcolor="#FFFFFF"
| 
| 14.15 (99)
| 
| 12.9 (81)
| Kardinia Park
| 42,198
| 16 August 1980
|- bgcolor="#FFFFFF"
| 
| 11.13 (79)
| 
| 20.15 (135)
| VFL Park
| 21,739
| 16 August 1980

Round 21

|- bgcolor="#CCCCFF"
| Home team
| Home team score
| Away team
| Away team score
| Venue
| Crowd
| Date
|- bgcolor="#FFFFFF"
| 
| 14.14 (98)
| 
| 15.19 (109)
| Arden Street Oval
| 23,682
| 23 August 1980
|- bgcolor="#FFFFFF"
| 
| 16.21 (117)
| 
| 20.12 (132)
| Junction Oval
| 12,004
| 23 August 1980
|- bgcolor="#FFFFFF"
| 
| 19.16 (130)
| 
| 13.14 (92)
| Victoria Park
| 23,472
| 23 August 1980
|- bgcolor="#FFFFFF"
| 
| 14.17 (101)
| 
| 18.14 (122)
| MCG
| 23,530
| 23 August 1980
|- bgcolor="#FFFFFF"
| 
| 13.9 (87)
| 
| 20.16 (136)
| Moorabbin Oval
| 21,258
| 23 August 1980
|- bgcolor="#FFFFFF"
| 
| 16.17 (113)
| 
| 12.11 (83)
| VFL Park
| 19,882
| 23 August 1980

Round 22

|- bgcolor="#CCCCFF"
| Home team
| Home team score
| Away team
| Away team score
| Venue
| Crowd
| Date
|- bgcolor="#FFFFFF"
| 
| 11.17 (83)
| 
| 12.11 (83)
| Arden Street Oval
| 10,302
| 30 August 1980
|- bgcolor="#FFFFFF"
| 
| 15.12 (102)
| 
| 8.14 (62)
| Windy Hill
| 17,772
| 30 August 1980
|- bgcolor="#FFFFFF"
| 
| 21.20 (146)
| 
| 20.22 (142)
| Princes Park
| 22,495
| 30 August 1980
|- bgcolor="#FFFFFF"
| 
| 16.11 (107)
| 
| 7.11 (53)
| Lake Oval
| 21,964
| 30 August 1980
|- bgcolor="#FFFFFF"
| 
| 9.12 (66)
| 
| 19.10 (124)
| MCG
| 52,791
| 30 August 1980
|- bgcolor="#FFFFFF"
| 
| 12.18 (90)
| 
| 5.10 (40)
| VFL Park
| 21,186
| 30 August 1980

Ladder

Finals

Qualifying & Elimination Finals

|- bgcolor="#CCCCFF"
| Game
| Home team
| Home team score
| Away team
| Away team score
| Venue
| Crowd
| Date
|- bgcolor="#FFFFFF"
| QF
| 
| 10.14 (74)
| 
| 18.8 (116)
| VFL Park
| 59,014 
| 6 September 1980 
|- bgcolor="#FFFFFF"
| EF
| 
| 14.12 (96)
| 
| 14.20 (104)
| MCG
| 83,033
| 6 September 1980

Semi finals

|- bgcolor="#CCCCFF"
| Game
| Home team
| Home team score
| Away team
| Away team score
| Venue
| Crowd
| Date
|- bgcolor="#FFFFFF"
| 1st SF
| 
| 15.12 (102)
| 
| 22.20 (152)
| MCG
| 94,451  
| 13 September 1980 
|- bgcolor="#FFFFFF"
| 2nd SF
| 
| 11.5 (71)
| 
| 14.11 (95)
| VFL Park
| 65,303 
| 13 September 1980

Preliminary Final

|- bgcolor="#CCCCFF"
| Game
| Home team
| Home team score
| Away team
| Away team score
| Venue
| Crowd
| Date
|- bgcolor="#FFFFFF"
| PF
| 
| 13.11 (89)
| 
| 13.15 (93)
| VFL Park
| 75,526  
| 20 September 1980

Grand final

Richmond defeated Collingwood 23.21 (159) to 9.24 (78), in front of a crowd of 113,461 people. (For an explanation of scoring see Australian rules football).

|- bgcolor="#CCCCFF"
| Game
| Home team
| Home team score
| Away team
| Away team score
| Venue
| Crowd
| Date
|- bgcolor="#FFFFFF"
| Grand Final
| 
|  23.21 (159)
| 
| 9.24 (78)
| MCG
| 113,461 
| 27 September 1980

Awards
 The leading goal kicker was Michael Roach of Richmond with 112 goals
 The Brownlow Medal was won by Footscray's Kelvin Templeton
 The Richmond Football Club set a unique record, with the club's three full-forwards each kicking more than 100 goals in the 1980 season.
 The full-forward of its Senior team, Michael Roach, kicked 112 goals.
 The full-forward of its Reserve team, Mark Jackson, kicked 131 goals (a record for the Reserve competition).
 The full-forward of its Under-19 team, Peter Lane, kicked 116 goals.
 The under 19s premiership was won by Richmond 15.13 (103) against Fitzroy 13.11 (89) in the under 19s Grand Final on 27 September.
 The reserves premiership was won by Geelong 24.15 (159) against South Melbourne 19.12 (126) in the reserves Grand Final on 27 September.
 The seniors premiership was won by Richmond 23.21 (159) against Collingwood 9.24 (78) in the seniors Grand Final on 27 September.

Notable events
 Following persistent wrestling between ruckmen Peter Moore and Gary Dempsey at centre bounces during the 1979 Preliminary Final between Collingwood and North Melbourne, the VFL introduced for the 1980 season a dividing line drawn across the centre circle in the wing-to-wing direction; under the new rules, each ruckman was forced to begin and run from his side of the line at a centre bounce, to eliminate wrestling. The rule was officially adopted at the national level in November 1982.
 In Round 4, Essendon's Phil Carman was reported for striking St. Kilda's Garry Sidebottom and headbutting boundary umpire Graham Carberry at Moorabbin. He was suspended for a total of 20 matches—4 for striking Sidebottom and 16 for headbutting Carberry. 
 North Melbourne's Kerry Good scored the winning goal after the final siren had sounded in the 1980 Escort Championships Night Grand Final at VFL Park—a goal that was highly controversial as the umpires had not heard the siren seconds before Kerry Good had marked the ball from a kick by Malcolm Blight. Collingwood lost the match by only three points. 
In the end, Footscray-J.U.S.T. played most of its games elsewhere, and the League was not forced to follow through on its ultimatum.
On 5 July, the VFL put together three separate Victorian representative teams to compete in different interstate games. The No. 1 team recorded a 21-point victory against Western Australia at VFL Park, and the No. 2 team recorded an 80-point win against Queensland at the Gabba; but, the No. 3 team suffered an upset 13-point loss against the A.C.T. at Manuka Oval, prompting league president Dr Allan Aylett to describe it as the worst team ever to represent Victoria.
 1980 was the first season in which neither of the top two teams of the home-and-away season reached the grand final. It would be the only such instance for nearly four decades, until the 2019 AFL season.
 To date, this is the only season in which the bottom placed side scored more points during the home & away season than the top finishing side.

See also
 McIntyre "final five" system

References

Bibliography
 Stephen Rogers and Ashley Browne (1998). Every Game Ever Played. 6th ed. Victoria: Penguin Books.

Australian Football League seasons
VFL season